Josef Kahl (31 March 1913 – 23 February 1942) was a Czech ski jumper. He competed in the individual event at the 1936 Winter Olympics. He was killed in action during World War II.

References

External links
 

1913 births
1942 deaths
Czech male ski jumpers
Olympic ski jumpers of Czechoslovakia
Ski jumpers at the 1936 Winter Olympics
People from Harrachov
German military personnel killed in World War II
Sportspeople from the Liberec Region